The canton of Montmorillon is an administrative division of the Vienne department, western France. Its borders were modified at the French canton reorganisation which came into effect in March 2015. Its seat is in Montmorillon.

It consists of the following communes:
 
Angles-sur-l'Anglin
Antigny
Béthines
Bourg-Archambault
Brigueil-le-Chantre
La Bussière
Coulonges
Haims
Jouhet
Journet
Lathus-Saint-Rémy
Liglet
Montmorillon
Moulismes
Nalliers
Pindray
Plaisance
La Puye
Saint-Germain
Saint-Léomer
Saint-Pierre-de-Maillé
Saint-Savin
Saulgé
Thollet
La Trimouille
Villemort

References

Cantons of Vienne